Deg Teg Fateh is a Sikh slogan and the title of an anthem in the Punjabi language that signifies the dual obligations of the Khalsa: The responsibility to provide food, and to provide protection, for the needy and oppressed.

Description
Deg refers to the "cauldron" and Tegh to the "sword". The cauldron or kettle symbolizes charity and is a reference to the Sikh religious obligation to provide langar, the free distribution of food, to all people, irrespective of an individual's religion, caste or ethnicity. 
The sword, or (kirpan), represents the warrior code of the Khalsa. The Khanda icon conveys these two principles.

A translation of the Degh Tegh Fateh into English:
"Victory in war and prosperity in peace have been obtained from Guru Nanak-Gobind Singh. God is one! Victory to the Presence! This is the order of Sri Sachcha Sahib to the entire Khalsa. The Guru will protect you. Call upon the Guru's name. Your lives will be fruitful! You are the Khalsa of the great immortal God. On seeing this anthem, repair to the presence, wearing five arms. Observe the rules of conduct laid down for the Khalsa. Do not use bhang, tobocco, poppy, wine, or any other intoxicant ... Commit no theft nor adultery. We have brought Satyug Love one another. This is my wish. He who lives according to the rules of Khalsa shall be saved by the Guru."

Adoption of Degh Tegh Fateh
The Sikh warrior Banda Singh Bahadur incorporated this slogan into his seal, and Sardar Jassa Singh Ahluwalia struck it into coins in 1765 after decisively defeating the rival Afghans.

This inscription was later adopted by the Sikh Misaldar Sardars and rulers on their coins. It was the national anthem of the princely state of Patiala during the Sikh Confederacy. This national anthem had been sung in all the Sikh States until 1948. B.K.S. Nabha describes it in the encyclopedia / dictionary Mahan Kosh (1930).

Footnotes

References
 

Sikh literature
Asian anthems